The William Spain Seismic Observatory is located at the Rose Hill Campus of Fordham University  in the Bronx, New York   
The seismic recordings from this location are  the oldest in the region and among the oldest in the United States.  It is named for a student who died unexpectedly.  A plaque of St. Emidio, patron saint of earthquakes, hangs on the door of the observatory building.

References 

Fordham University
Seismological observatories, organisations and projects